Antoine Blanc Gingras (October 20, 1875 – April 27, 1937) was a top scoring Metis amateur ice hockey right winger who was active in the late 1890s and early 1900s. Born at Saint Boniface, Winnipeg, to Métis parents François Gingras and Annie McMurray, he was named for his grandfather, Antoine Blanc Gingras, a well-known fur trader and one of the founders of St. Joseph (now Walhalla), North Dakota. 

Gingras played with the Winnipeg Victorias of the Manitoba Hockey Association and won two Stanley Cups with the team, in 1901 against the Montreal Shamrocks  and in 1902 against the Toronto Wellingtons. On the Victorias team Gingras formed a successful partnership with center forward Dan Bain.

Gingras died in Winnipeg in 1937.

References

1875 births
1937 deaths
Canadian ice hockey right wingers
People from Saint Boniface, Winnipeg
Ice hockey people from Winnipeg
Winnipeg Victorias players
Métis sportspeople